was an Edo period Japanese samurai, and the 9th daimyō  of Kaga Domain in the Hokuriku region of Japan. He was the 10th hereditary chieftain of the Kanazawa Maeda clan. 

Shigemichi was born in Kanazawa as Kenjiro (健次郎), the seventh son of Maeda Yoshinori. His mother was a concubine and he was initially destined to be adopted by Kaga clan retainer Moirai Nagakata; however, with so many of his brother dying untimely deaths during the O-Ie Sōdō known as the “Kaga Sōdō”  these plans were cancelled. In 1753, he was named to succeed his brother Maeda Shigenobu and became daimyō the same year. He immediately prepared to depart for Edo, but came down with measles (the same disease which had killed his brother), and his departure was delayed by a year. He was received in formal  audience by Shogun Tokugawa Ieshige in 1754 and his posthumous adoption and position as daimyō  was confirmed. 

One of his first steps was to end the  “Kaga Sōdō” by siding firmly with the conservative faction, ending the fiscal experiments begun by Ōtsuki Denzō. While this purge brought political stability back to the domain, the domain finances immediately spiralled out of control. In 1759, Kanazawa Castle burned down, along with much of the surrounding castle town, and to domain was forced to borrow 50,000 ryō from the shogunate for immediate repairs.

Sgigemichi was a noted patron of Noh and Kyōgen drama.

Shigemichi yielded headship to his half-brother Harunaga in 1771, and died in 1786 at age 44.

Family
Father: Maeda Yoshinori
Mother: Jitsujoin
Wife: Tokugawa Senmanhime, daughter of Tokugawa Munemasa of Wakayama Domain
Concubines:
 Oshun no Kata later Eshoin
 Omoyo no Kata later Shingetsuin
 Oyasu no Kata
 Tenrin’in
 Ohatsu no Kata later Shugetsuin
Children: 
 Kunihime (1761-1771) by Oshun no Kata
 Eihime (1766-1801) married Matsudaira Katasada by Oshun no Kata
 daughter (1776) by Omoyo no Kata
 Maeda Naritaka (1778-1795) by Oyasu no Kata
 Fujihime married Matsudaira Yorinori (Takamatsu domain) by  Tenrin’in
 Maeda Narinaga by Tenrin’in
 Son (1785) by Ohatsu no Kata

References 
Papinot, Edmond. (1948). Historical and Geographical Dictionary of Japan. New York: Overbeck Co.

External links
Kaga Domain on "Edo 300 HTML" (3 November 2007) 

1741 births
1786 deaths
People of Edo-period Japan
Maeda clan
Tozama daimyo